Rick Cook may refer to:

 Rick Cook (architect) (born 1960), New York City architect
 Rick Cook (writer) (born 1944), American author of novels and stories